Anjali Pictures is an Indian film production house owned by famous music director P. Adinarayana Rao and versatile film actress Anjali Devi.

Filmography

Producer

References 

Film production companies of Andhra Pradesh
Year of establishment missing